Temple Beth Israel of Highland Park and Eagle Rock is an egalitarian synagogue located at 5711 Monte Vista Street in Highland Park, Los Angeles, California. Though originally a Conservative synagogue, it is unaffiliated with any Jewish religious movements.

First organized as the Highland Park Hebrew School Association in 1923, it completed construction of its Spanish Colonial Revival style building in 1930, at a cost of $4,077.88 (today $). It is the second oldest synagogue in Los Angeles still operating in its original location, after the Wilshire Boulevard Temple (built in 1929).

Notes

Synagogues in Los Angeles
Highland Park, Los Angeles
Unaffiliated synagogues in the United States
Jewish organizations established in 1923
1923 establishments in California
Synagogues completed in 1930
1930 establishments in California
Spanish Colonial Revival architecture in California
Spanish Colonial Revival synagogues